Mixcoac from Nahuatl means "viper in the cloud" is an archaeological zone belonging to the Mexica (Aztec) culture. It was on the shores of Lake Texcoco and in its final stage was under the rule of Tenochtitlan. With the arrival of the Spanish conquistadors, the settlement was practically destroyed to its foundations, which are the only thing that survives of the architecture of the place and can be appreciated today in what is today the San Pedro de los Pinos neighborhood, on the corner of San Antonio avenue and Periférico, in Mexico City.

The name Mixcoac, viper of the cloud, could be understood as a representation of the celestial serpent or Milky Way. The occupation of this archaeological area is estimated to have occurred from 900 BC to 1521 AD.

History
The site was occupied and built by the Mexicas shortly before 1521. This is demonstrated by the aesthetics and style of pottery and the architecture of the buildings. The temple of Mixcoatl is a pyramid-shaped building to which another building was added, built with floors and cement walls and tepetate. The spaces between the two buildings, as was common at the time and following the example of Tenayuca, were filled with stones, mud and remains of the first building. On the site the foundations of a second building that had 15 rooms on top survive, most of them with floors. Several walls were also located on the south side. A number of adobe rooms were found in the northeast.

The site of Mixcoac, belonged to the altepetl of Coyohuacan when the lake area was the territory of the Tepanecs of Azcapotzalco, long before the arrival of the Mexicas to the Cemanahuac.

Mixcoac had a privileged location, as it was located near the great lake, as well as the rivers and streams that descended from the mountainous area located to the west (the current neighborhood of Santa Fe). Numerous agricultural towns were built around it. It is thought that the place was frequented by musicians and dancers from the Valley of Mexico and that a very popular party was held between receiving the views of the inhabitants of Tenochtitlan, Tlatelolco and other nearby towns. As part of these festivities, hunting excursions were carried out from this site to the surroundings of the mount of Zacatepec, before the beginning of the hunt the participants had to go through the adoration of Mixcoatl.

The samples of ceramics from the area are stylistically related to the other sites of contemporary culture of Mesoamerica as Zacatenco, El Arbolillo and Ticomán. There are also magnificent examples of vases and boxes with clear Teotihuacan influence.

The site was not open to the public, however, in August 2019, the INAH reported that the area can already be visited, access is free.

See also
Mixcoac
List of pre-columbian archaeological sites in Mexico City

References 

 Luis Alberto López Wario, Arqueología de la ciudad de México vol. XI, número 60, pp. 68-76

Archaeological sites in Mexico City
Aztec sites
Mesoamerican sites
Former populated places in Mexico
9th-century establishments in North America
Indigenous peoples in Mexico City